Petel is a surname. Notable people with the surname include:

 Anne-Laurence Petel (born 1970), French politician
 David Petel (1921–2019), Israeli politician
 Georg Petel (1601/2–1635), German sculptor

See also
 
 Petek
 Peter (surname)